Valeria Álvarez (born 7 January 1978) is an Argentinean former swimmer.

Career 

At the 1996 Summer Olympic Games she competed in five events. She finished 39th in the women's 50 metre freestyle, 43rd in the women's 100 metre freestyle, 
30th in the women's 100 metre backstroke, 23rd in the women's 4 × 100 m medley relay and 21st in the women's 4 × 200 m freestyle relay.

References

1978 births
Living people
Olympic swimmers of Argentina
Argentine female backstroke swimmers
Swimmers at the 1996 Summer Olympics
Female backstroke swimmers